The Praça XV de Novembro, is a public square in the Centro section of the city of Rio de Janeiro, Brazil.

Location
The square is located in the historical centre of Rio de Janeiro and is flanked by the Tiradentes Palace, the seat of the Legislative Assembly of Rio de Janeiro; and the Paço Imperial. The Praça XV Station is a ferry terminal servicing a number of destinations in the city of Rio de Janeiro and Niteroi.

References

Squares in Rio de Janeiro